The Groeningemuseum is a municipal museum in Bruges, Belgium, built on the site of the medieval Eekhout Abbey.

It houses a collection of Flemish and Belgian painting covering six centuries, from Jan van Eyck to Marcel Broodthaers. The museum's highlights include Early Netherlandish paintings, works by Renaissance and Baroque masters, as well as a selection of paintings from the 18th and 19th century neo-classical and realist periods, milestones of Belgian symbolism and modernism, masterpieces of Flemish Expressionism and many items from the city's collection of post-war modern art.

Works include
 Jan van Eyck:
The Madonna with Canon van der Paele (1436)
Portrait of Margareta van Eyck (1439)
Portrait of Christ (1440)
 Pieter Pourbus
 Gerard David
 The Judgment of Cambyses Part 1, The Judgment of Sisamnes (1498)
 The Judgment of Cambyses Part 2, The Flaying of Sisamnes (1498)
 The Baptism of Christ (1502-1508)
 Hieronymus Bosch and workshop
 The Last Judgement (c. 1486)
 Adriaen Isenbrandt:
Portrait of Paulus de Nigro (1518)
Triptych
Hugo van der Goes
Death of the Virgin (c. 1472–1480)
 Nicolaes Maes:
Portrait of Four Children (1657)
 Jan Provoost
Crucifixion (ca 1500)
Last Judgment for the Bruges town hall (1525)
 Dirk Bouts
Triptych of the Martyrdom of St. Hippolytus Fernand KhnopffSecret-Reflet René MagritteL'AttentatVigor van HeedeAllegorical portrait of a man''

Sources

External links

Museum website

Art museums and galleries in Belgium
History of Bruges
Museums in Bruges
Flemish art